Paul Darrow (born Paul Valentine Birkby; 2 May 1941 – 3 June 2019) was an English actor. He became best known for playing Kerr Avon in the BBC science fiction television series Blake's 7 between 1978 and 1981. His many television roles included two appearances in another BBC science fiction series, Doctor Who, playing Captain Hawkins in Doctor Who and the Silurians (1970) and Tekker in Timelash (1985). He was also the voice of "Jack" on independent radio stations JACKfm and Union JACK, whose lines included dry-witted comments pertaining to current events.

Early years 
Darrow was born Paul Valentine Birkby in Chessington, Surrey, on 2 May 1941. He received his formal education at Haberdashers' Aske's Boys' School, before studying at the Royal Academy of Dramatic Art. While at RADA, he shared a flat with fellow actors John Hurt and Ian McShane.

Career
Darrow worked extensively in theatre and television.

His television appearances include: Emergency – Ward 10, The Saint, Z-Cars, Dixon of Dock Green, Within These Walls, as the Sheriff of Nottingham in the 1975 BBC series The Legend of Robin Hood, as Mr. Tallboy in the 1973 adaptation of Dorothy L. Sayers' Murder Must Advertise, as Thomas Doughty in the television film Drake's Venture, Dombey and Son, Maelstrom, Making News, Pie in the Sky, Hollyoaks, Toast of London and Little Britain. He provided the voiceover for Biblical quotations in Richard Dawkins's The Root of All Evil?. He had a one-off appearance in the 1990 series of Cluedo, but did not play the murder victim. He was also the presenter of the BBC3 reality series Hercules (2004).

Darrow appeared as the character Avon, for which he was best known, in all but the first episode of Blake's 7. Proud of his work on that series, Darrow acted as its most prolific spokesman, both in the UK and the US, during the late 1980s. In the mid-to-late 1990s, he purchased the rights to Blake's 7 and attempted to produce a big-budget follow-up mini-series, Blake's 7: A Rebellion Reborn. According to Darrow, it would have begun 25 years after the ending of the original series and might have included an ageing Avon passing the torch to a new generation.

His film credits are few, but include roles as doctors in The Raging Moon (1971) and the Bond movie Die Another Day (2002), for which he filmed but much of his material was deleted before the film went on release to cinemas. Darrow appears briefly in the final product.

Darrow recorded voice-overs and straplines for UK JACKfm station in Oxfordshire. He also provided the voice of the character Grand Moff Tarkin in the computer game Star Wars: Empire at War. He also voiced the character of Zarok in the PlayStation game MediEvil; his recordings were re-used in the game's 2019 remake. Darrow appeared in Emmerdale from 13 July 2009, playing Eddy Fox, Alan Turner's friend; he knows Turner as "Tank". He also played the character of Kaston Iago in the Kaldor City audio releases.

Darrow also provided the voice of a main character in the PC game Hostile Waters: Antaeus Rising. The actress Glynis Barber, who played Soolin in Blake's 7, provided the voice for the main female character. The game was narrated by Tom Baker of Doctor Who fame.

Darrow played the role of Sam Vimes in the 1998/99 touring production of the play based on Terry Pratchett's Discworld novel Guards! Guards!.

In 2004, Darrow was the subject of the fourth volume of MJTV's "The Actor Speaks" audio CDs, featuring frank interviews and dramatic pieces, alongside guest Peter Miles, with a piece specifically written by Tanith Lee.

Darrow narrated the 2008 audio book of Terry Nation's classic children's story Rebecca's World: Journey to the Forbidden Planet (2008)

In December 2011, Darrow voiced the character of Overseer Tremel in the Bioware MMORPG release Star Wars: The Old Republic.

In 2012, Darrow returned to the role of Kerr Avon in Big Finish Productions' Blake's 7: The Liberator Chronicles, a series of dramatic readings which take place during Series One, Two and Three of the original show. He also reprised the part in Blake's 7: The Classic Audio Adventures, a full-cast audio drama series.

In 2015, Darrow starred as Paul Rand, the enigmatic business man in charge of the business institute Atlas in the interactive video game Contradiction: Spot the Liar!. A sequel was planned in 2016, but never came to fruition.

Darrow was Patron of the University of York Astronomy Society (AstroSoc) from 1981 to 1984.

An extinct crocodile from the Miocene of Australia, Baru darrowi, was named after Darrow.

On 27 October 2018, Darrow appeared on (and won) a celebrity sci-fi edition of the quiz show Pointless, along with fellow Blake's 7 star Michael Keating.

Personal life
In the mid-1960s Darrow married the actress Janet Lees-Price. They were married almost fifty years, until her death in 2012, and lived in later life in Billingshurst, West Sussex.

Illness and death 
In his last years Darrow suffered a decline in health. In 2014, he had an aortic aneurysm, and due to complications during its treatment, surgeons had to amputate both his legs. He died on the morning of 3 June 2019 at the age of 78. The 2019 remake of MediEvil, which featured Darrow as the voice of the main antagonist Zarok, was dedicated to his memory.

Publications 
 Avon: A Terrible Aspect (1989), a Blake's 7 prequel novel about Avon's father and Avon's own early life. 
 Queen: The eYe (1997), a novelisation of the video game of the same name.
 You're Him, Aren't You? (2006), autobiography. (Re-released as an audio book narrated by Darrow in 2016.)
 Lucifer (2013), first of a trilogy of books set after the events of Blake's 7.
 Lucifer: Revelation (2014), second of a trilogy of books set after the events of Blake's 7.
 Lucifer: Genesis (2015), third of a trilogy of books set after the events of Blake's 7.

Filmography

Film

Television

Video Games

Radio and CD audio dramas

References

External links 

 Paul Darrow at the British Film Institute
 

1941 births
2019 deaths
20th-century English male actors
21st-century English male actors
Alumni of RADA
English amputees
English male television actors
English male voice actors
English male writers
English writers
Male actors from Surrey
People educated at Haberdashers' Boys' School